Kota, or iKota, is an Bantu language spoken by the Bakota people. It is spoken in northeastern Gabon, Ogooué-Ivindo Province and in some areas of Republic of Congo. According to Ethnologue there are 34,442 Kota speakers in Gabon and 9,055 in the Republic of Congo.

Kota includes several dialects, which include: Ndambomo, Mahongwe, Ikota-la-hua, Sake, Menzambi, Bougom.

References

 
Kele languages
Languages of Gabon
Languages of the Republic of the Congo